This Is It is the seventh studio album by American country music artist Jack Ingram, released in 2007. It is his second album for Big Machine Records. It features a cover of Hinder's hit single "Lips of an Angel", which Ingram released as a single, reaching No. 16 on the Billboard Hot Country Songs charts with it. "Measure of a Man" and "Maybe She'll Get Lonely", the second and third singles, respectively reached No. 18 and No. 24 on the same chart. Also featured are the singles "Wherever You Are" and "Love You", both of which were the only studio tracks on the otherwise live compilation Live: Wherever You Are, which Ingram released in 2006. This Is It also features the music videos for those two songs.

Track listing

Production
As listed in liner notes.
Jeremy Stover – tracks 1-5, 7, 11
Doug Lancio – tracks 6, 12
Jack Ingram and Jeremy Stover – track 10
Doug Lancio and Jeremy Stover – tracks 8, 9

Chart performance

Album

Singles

References

2007 albums
Big Machine Records albums
Jack Ingram albums
Albums produced by Jeremy Stover